Londonbeat is a English dance-pop band who scored a number of pop and dance hits in the early 1990s. Band members are American Jimmy Helms (who also had a successful solo career and sang radio jingles for Radio Hallam and Hereward Radio in the UK); Jimmy Chambers (born 29 January 1946), from Trinidad, and Charles Pierre. Former members include multi-instrumentalist William Henshall (credited as Willy M); George Chandler (formerly a founding member and frontman of Olympic Runners); Marc Goldschmitz (subsequently a member of the band Leash) and Myles Kayne.

History
Londonbeat's career started in the Netherlands where "There's a Beat Going On" reached the top 10, and then "9 A.M (The Comfort Zone)" which subsequently became a modest success in the United Kingdom. They are best known for their song "I've Been Thinking About You", which hit Number 1 on the Billboard Hot 100 and the Hot Dance Music/Club Play charts in 1991, and for their close harmonies. Their follow-up single, "A Better Love", became a Billboard Hot 100 Top 20 hit, and they returned to Number 1 on the dance chart with "Come Back" (Hot 100 number 62).

Comeback
In 1995, Londonbeat entered the UK heats of the Eurovision Song Contest with "I'm Just Your Puppet on a ... (String)". However, they were not selected to enter the main contest (losing out to rap group Love City Groove) and the single stalled at Number 55 on the UK Singles Chart.

In 2003, Londonbeat re-grouped with a new lineup and signed to German record label Coconut. An album called Back in the Hi-Life featured re-recordings of "A Better Love" and "I've Been Thinking About You" among the new tracks.

Marc Goldschmitz left the band in 2004. Currently living in Berlin, he now plays guitar in the band Leash.

Other information
Chambers and Chandler were backing vocalists for Paul Young's 1985 album The Secret of Association.

Jimmy Helms, George Chandler & Jimmy Chambers were also backing vocals on the Deacon Blue single "When Will You Make My Telephone Ring" and Fine Young Cannibals album The Raw and the Cooked on three songs: "Good Thing", "Tell Me What" and "It's OK (It's Alright)".

Chandler, Chambers and Helms were also backing vocals on the Godley & Creme single "A Little Piece of Heaven", and the 1988 album Goodbye Blue Sky.

Line-ups
Jimmy Helms is the only member present in every Londonbeat line up. Jimmy Chambers is also present in every line-up with the exception of the 1999 line-up, but the band is known as "New Londonbeat" due to his absence.

1988–1992
 Jimmy Helms
 Jimmy Chambers
 George Chandler
 William Henshall (Willy M)

1994–1995
 Jimmy Helms
 Jimmy Chambers
 William Henshall (Willy M)

1999
 Jimmy Helms
 Charles Pierre
 Tony Blaze

2003–2004
 Jimmy Helms
 Jimmy Chambers
 Myles Kayne
 Marc Goldschmitz

2004–2018
 Jimmy Helms
 Jimmy Chambers
 Myles Kayne

2018–present
 Jimmy Helms
 Jimmy Chambers
 Charles Pierre

Discography

Studio albums
 Speak (1988) [No U.S. release]
 In the Blood (1990)
 Harmony (1992) [No U.S. release]
 Londonbeat (1994)
 Back in the Hi-Life (2003) [No U.S. release]
 Gravity (2004) [No U.S. release]
 30 Years (2019)

See also
 List of number-one hits (United States)
 List of artists who reached number one on the Hot 100 (U.S.)
 List of number-one dance hits (United States)
 List of artists who reached number one on the U.S. Dance chart

References

External links
 Official website

British dance music groups
Black British musical groups
British musical trios
Musical groups established in 1988